VERMEG is an international software group operating across several lines of B2B services: pensions & insurance, wealth & asset management, financial & security markets and Digital Financial Services. The company develops software used across the private banking sector, consumer finance, asset management companies, Central banks, insurance and other financial services providers covering insurance policy administration, asset portfolio management, regulatory reporting, collateral management, post-trade processing, low code application development, business process management and risk management.

The company was formed in 1993 by Badreddine Ouali and has headquarters in Amsterdam.

History
VERMEG was founded in 1993 in Tunisia, initially under the name of BFI and was spun off from BFI in 2002. Its headquarters are now in Amsterdam and it has offices globally, including North America, Latin America, France, Belgium, Luxembourg, UK, Singapore and Tunisia.

In 2017, Crédit Mutuel Arkéa acquired 19.5% stake in VERMEG.

Acquisition
VERMEG has expanded both organically and via strategic acquisitions over the years:
 In 2011, the firm acquired the regulatory reporting business of Sofgen. The main part of the business acquired, which in the past was known in the US regulatory market as IDOM USA, is the United States and Canada regulatory reporting product REG-Reporter
 In 2014, VERMEG acquired the Belgium-based firm BSB, which specialized in financial software for insurance and private banking.
 In 2018, the firm acquired Lombard Risk, an international provider of software for risk management, regulatory reporting and collateral management

Products
VERMEG provides across several financial sectors including asset management, Central banking, retail banking, consumer finance, investment banking, regulatory reporting, pensions and insurance with over 400 clients worldwide including some of the world's largest financial institutions.
 
Among VERMEGs Solutions are:
 MEGARA: Asset Management Solution covering Settlement, Fund Administration, Corporate Actions and Collateral Management for Central Banks.
 COLLINE: Collateral management Solution for Investment Banking.
 AGILE Reporter: Regulatory Reporting Solution.
 SOLIFE: Life insurance Policy Contract Management Administration System
 SOLIAM: Wealth Management and Private Banking Portfolio Administration System.
 MASSAI: "Non-Life" Insurance Solution containing the following modules: product, policy, claim and accounting.

VERMEG also offers a low code application development platforms:
 Veggo : Open Architecture Low Code Application Development platform and Components Marketplace 
 Magikforms  : No code, drag and drop form builder for insurance and banking.

Awards and certifications

Awards
 AGILE Reporter: Best Regulation Reporting Solution for 2018.
 Central Banking Awards: Risk Management Technology Provider of the Year 2019.
 Grant Thornton: Best Regulatory Reporting Management Solution 2019.
 Custody Risk Global Awards: Collateral Platform Provider of the year 2017.
 Operational Risk & Regulation Awards: Best Regulatory Reporting Platform/Service 2015.

Certifications
 ISO certification for Management and Security of Information.
 United Nations Global Compact.
 Best Place to Work for LGBTQ Equality in 2019.
 Certified Application for Collateral Management, Corporate Actions and Securities Settlement in 2019
 Singapore Fintech Association.

References

External links
Vermeg Acquires Lombard Risk To Create Global Financial Software Leader

1994 establishments in Tunisia
Companies established in 1994
Companies of Tunisia
Organisations based in Tunis
Economy of Tunis